MUUSE is an privately owned fashion company based in Copenhagen, Denmark that develops, manufactures and markets designs which are created by independent fashion designers. MUUSE selects designers by using talent scouts and sponsoring contests.  The designers receive royalties on sales.

History
MUUSE was founded in 2011 by David Dencker (CEO) and Gitte Jonsdatter (Strategy Director).

Talent Scouting
MUUSE staff collaborate with fashion institutions, serving on their graduation show juries, and receiving recommendations for talent. Twice a year MUUSE and VOGUE Talents run an online contest, and present one winner with the MUUSE x VOGUE Talents Young Vision Award. The competition winner is featured in Vogue's publication VOGUE Talents, and is given the opportunity to produce a capsule collection with MUUSE and other prizes.  The contest attracted more than 300 entries and 150,000 votes in 2012; and the winner was Heidi Paula. In 2016 the winner, Pamela Samasuwo Nyawiri, was given a scholarship to Harvard University.

Collaborative Product Development
MUUSE Designers are responsible for the design of styles, while the MUUSE production staff takes care of sourcing textiles, negotiating with manufacturers, quality control and fitting. There are two types of clothing produced: Ready-to-Wear and Couture. Ready-to-Wear pieces are produced in small batches of between 20 and 100 pieces.   Production outsourced to small manufacturers in Europe and Asia. Couture pieces are sewn to-order by MUUSE tailors to fit the buyer's measurements, matching the designer's prototypes, with alterations for wearability and to meet requests from buyers.

   dnfls skflsms dkft5n skfkdyu dkamfk 아무릴 쇼ㅐㅇ강 알수 없느 ㄹ상대ㅑ  그래서 얘기를 헀는 데요... ???
  
  GUIER,  gRAPHa TISEER,,  STATUS  ADG..   인어 ,,,   HALF fISH,,,  MANTO- FIH//   ???

Sales model
Pieces are sold under the designer's name, labelled ‘(Designer Name) by MUUSE’.  The clothing is sold via the company's online boutique and through online and offline retail partners in Europe. The products are shipped to Europe and the United States.

References

External links
http://www.muuse.com/
"Muuse and Vogue Talents". vogue.it.
"Muuse". www.crowdsourcing.org.

Companies established in 2011
Fashion industry